The 1997 IIHF InLine Hockey World Championship was the second IIHF InLine Hockey World Championship, the premier annual international inline hockey tournament. It took place at Anaheim, California, United States, with the gold-medal game played July 25, 1997, at the Arrowhead Pond.

Teams
The twelve-team tournament was split into two groups.

Group A comprised
Canada
Finland
Germany
Russia
Switzerland
United States

and Group B comprised
Australia
Austria
Czech Republic
Italy
Japan
Netherlands

Tournament

Preliminary round
Scores

Group A standings

Group B standings

Playoff round

Quarterfinals

Semifinals

Gold medal game

Bronze medal game

Consolation round

5th place game

7th place game

9th place game

References

IIHF InLine Hockey World Championship
1997 in inline hockey
1997 in American sports
1997 in sports in California
Inline hockey in the United States
International sports competitions hosted by the United States